Roberto Ronaldo Brown Perea (born July 15, 1977) is a Panamanian former professional footballer who played as a forward.

He was appointed assistant manager of sports of the Municipality of Panama in May 2014.

Club career
Nicknamed el Bombardero, Brown spent the majority of his early career playing for numerous teams in Central America and Europe.

After leaving Panamanian team Ejecutivo Junior for Costa Rican side Cartaginés in 1996, he helped Real España to the runner-up spot of the Liga Nacional de Fútbol de Honduras in 1999. In summer 1999 he crossed borders to play for Salvadoran side FAS, only to leave them after the season and joined Alianza in summer 2000.

Europe
After moving to play in Europe for FC Sheriff Tiraspol in Moldova in 2002, won three consecutive Divizia Naţională titles, as well as the 2002 Moldavian Cup, in which he scored Sheriff's second goal in the final against Nistru Otaci. In September 2004, Brown was snapped up by Austrian side SV Wüstenrot Salzburg.

In August 2005, Brown joined Uruguayan giants Peñarol and in August 2006 he made his debut for fellow Uruguayans Tacuarembó.

In 2007 Brown signed with the Colorado Rapids in the Major League Soccer, and during his short tenure there tallied scored three goals in 13 games until eventually being released on July 12, 2007.

Montreal Impact
Brown signed with the Montreal Impact on July 30, 2007. He made his Impact debut on August 16 against the California Victory which he registered his first goal for the club in a 2–0 victory. For the remainder of the season he appeared in eight matches. In the playoffs Brown tallied one goal and one assist in the first game of the quarterfinal series against the Puerto Rico Islanders on September 14. In the following season Brown missed a series of nine matches due to a thigh injury and a suspension. But from his return he recorded one goal and two assists on June 22 against the Carolina RailHawks, the goal scored by Brown was the 300th Impact goal in history scored at home. In the Nutrilite Canadian Championship, Brown scored two goals and most notably the tying goal against Toronto FC on July 22 at BMO Field that clinched the 2008 Nutrilite Canadian Championship for the Impact, and helped the club qualify to the CONCACAF Champions League. During the Impact tenure in the Champions League, Brown played a dominant role in scoring crucial goals for the Impact throughout the tournament. In total he scored four goals out of eight games and helped the Impact reach the quarterfinals before losing out to Santos Laguna to 5–4 on aggregate.

On January 12, 2009 the Montreal Impact announced the re-signing of Brown for the 2009 season. During the 2009 USL season Brown contributed by helping the Impact clinch a playoff spot under new head coach Marc Dos Santos. He recorded his first playoff goal in the semifinal match against Puerto Rico Islanders. The match resulted in 2–1 victory for the Impact, and allowing the Impact to advance to the finals by winning their second match on aggregate. Montreal would advance on to the finals where their opponents would end up being the Vancouver Whitecaps FC, thus marking the first time in USL history where the final match would consist of two Canadian clubs. On October 17, 2009 in the second game of finals Brown scored the third and final goal for the Impact, therefore winning the match and claiming Montreal's third USL Championship. Brown had come to terms with Montreal to extend his contract for another year. On July 12, 2010 the Montreal Impact released Brown.

He later played for second division side Universidad Millenium and San Francisco where he came out an early retirement in June 2013 for another season at the club. He retired in November 2013.

International career
Brown made his debut for the Panama national football team in January 2000 against Guatemala, immediately making an impact by scoring a goal. He earned a total of 54 caps, scoring 16 goals and represented his country in 17 FIFA World Cup qualification matches and played at the 2005 CONCACAF Gold Cup.

His final international was a January 2011 UNCAF Nations Cup match against El Salvador.

International goals
Scores and results list Panama's goal tally first.

Honours
Montreal Impact
 Canadian Championship: 2008

References

External links
 
 Montreal Impact bio
 rsssf.com

1977 births
Living people
Sportspeople from Panama City
Association football forwards
Panamanian footballers
Panama international footballers
2001 UNCAF Nations Cup players
2003 UNCAF Nations Cup players
2005 CONCACAF Gold Cup players
2011 Copa Centroamericana players
Alianza Panama players
C.S. Cartaginés players
Real C.D. España players
C.D. FAS footballers
Sporting San Miguelito players
San Francisco F.C. players
FC Sheriff Tiraspol players
FC Red Bull Salzburg players
Peñarol players
Tacuarembó F.C. players
Colorado Rapids players
Montreal Impact (1992–2011) players
Panamanian expatriate footballers
Expatriate soccer players in Canada
Panamanian expatriate sportspeople in Canada
Expatriate footballers in Costa Rica
Expatriate footballers in Honduras
Expatriate footballers in El Salvador
Expatriate footballers in Moldova
Panamanian expatriate sportspeople in Moldova
Expatriate footballers in Austria
Expatriate footballers in Uruguay
Expatriate soccer players in the United States
Panamanian expatriate sportspeople in the United States
Liga Nacional de Fútbol Profesional de Honduras players
Moldovan Super Liga players
Major League Soccer players
USL First Division players
USSF Division 2 Professional League players
Liga Panameña de Fútbol players
Panamanian expatriate sportspeople in El Salvador
Panamanian expatriate sportspeople in Austria
Panamanian expatriate sportspeople in Uruguay
Central American Games silver medalists for Panama
Central American Games medalists in football